Ashan Ranasinghe (born 8 September 1992) is a Sri Lankan cricketer. He made his List A debut for Matale District in the 2016–17 Districts One Day Tournament on 18 March 2017.

References

External links
 

1992 births
Living people
Sri Lankan cricketers
Matale District cricketers
Sri Lanka Navy Sports Club cricketers